Leionema ambiens is a rare shrub growing in the Guyra district of New South Wales and Queensland, Australia. It has long stem clasping leaves and heads of white flowers in spring and early summer.

Description
Flowering occurs from spring to early summer.

Taxonomy and naming
The species was first formally described in 1868 by Ferdinand von Mueller who gave it the name Eriostemon ambiens and the description was published in Fragmenta Phytogrphiae Australiae. In 1998 Paul G. Wilson changed the name to Leionema ambiens and the description was published in the journal Nuytsia. The specific epithet (ambiens) is derived from Latin meaning "going around" or "surround".

Distribution and habitat
This species has a restricted distribution, only found in the Guyra district of northern New South Wales growing in heath amongst granite boulders. It also grows in Queensland.

References

External links

ambiens
Sapindales of Australia
Flora of New South Wales
Flora of Queensland
Taxa named by Ferdinand von Mueller